ASCI or Asci may refer to:

 Advertising Standards Council of India
 Asci, the plural of ascus, in fungal anatomy
 Accelerated Strategic Computing Initiative
 American Society for Clinical Investigation
 Argus Sour Crude Index
 Association of Christian Schools International
 Associazione Scouts Cattolici Italiani, co-founder of Associazione Guide e Scouts Cattolici Italiani
 Administrative Staff College of India, Hyderabad

See also
 ASCII

pl:ASCI